Communauté d'agglomération de Dembeni-Mamoudzou is a communauté d'agglomération, an intercommunal structure in the Mayotte overseas department and region of France. Created in 2015, its seat is in Mamoudzou. Its area is 80.0 km2. Its population was 89,090 in 2019.

Composition
The communauté d'agglomération consists of the following 2 communes:
Dembeni
Mamoudzou

References

Dembeni-Mamoudzou
Dembeni-Mamoudzou